Cesinali (Irpino:) is a town and comune in the province of Avellino, Campania, southern Italy. It is an agricultural center.

References

Cities and towns in Campania